Gellhorn is a surname and may refer to:

Edna Fischel Gellhorn (1878–1970), American suffragist, mother of Martha Gellhorn
Ernest Gellhorn (1935–2005), American academic and legal scholar
Martha Gellhorn (1908–1998), American novelist, travel writer, journalist, war correspondent
Peter Gellhorn (1912–2004), German conductor, composer, pianist and teacher who made a career in Britain
Raymond Gellhorn, unscrupulous businessman character in the science fiction short story "Sally" by Isaac Asimov

See also
Hemingway & Gellhorn (2012), HBO film about the lives of journalist Martha Gellhorn and her husband, writer Ernest Hemingway
Martha Gellhorn Prize for Journalism, named for war correspondent Martha Gellhorn, established in 1999 by the Martha Gellhorn Trust